The Scottish Junior Football North Division Two was a third-tier division of the North Region of the Scottish Junior Football Association from 2003.

After the withdrawal of several clubs, including Dufftown, RAF Lossiemouth and Bishopmill United, the division was left with six clubs by the end of the 2012–13 season. The decision was taken at the 2013 Regional AGM to create two parallel Division One leagues distributed geographically and split existing Division Two clubs between these.

After five seasons, the previous simple three-division setup was adopted once again, with the lowest tier being the Scottish Junior Football North Second Division.

Champions

References

External links
North Region Division Two at Non-League Scotland (archive version, 2007-08 membership)

3
2003 establishments in Scotland
Sports leagues established in 2003
Sports leagues disestablished in 2013
2013 disestablishments in Scotland